Hasanagić is a surname. Notable people with the surname include:

Dragan Hasanagić (born 1965), Slovenian footballer
Mustafa Hasanagić (born 1941), Serbian footballer and manager

Bosnian surnames